Arthur Ward may refer to:

 Arthur Ward (dairy researcher) (1906–1993), New Zealand accountant, dairy researcher and administrator, company director and university chancellor
 Arthur Ward (priest) (1912–1998), Archdeacon in the United Kingdom
 Arthur Ward (cricketer) (1829–1884), English clergyman, cricketer and cricket administrator
 Art Ward (né Arthur Downs Ward; 1922–2002), American music industry entrepreneur
 Arthur Henry Ward (1883–1959), English novelist, better known as Sax Rohmer